Sohrang (also known as 'Sāreng and Sorāng) is a village in Heruz Rural District, Kuhsaran District, Ravar County, Kerman Province, Iran. At the 2006 census, its population was 41, in 13 families.

References 

Populated places in Ravar County